A sinusotomy is a surgical operation in which an incision is made in a sinus to prevent or reduce inflammation. The first sinusotomy was performed in 1962 by Kraznov.

See also 
 List of surgeries by type

References

Sinus surgery